Wilhelm Spiegelberg (25 June 1870, Hannover – 23 December 1930, Munich) was a German Egyptologist. He specialized in analyses of Demotic and hieratic text.

Spiegelberg grew up as the second oldest of four brothers in a German Jewish family. He studied Egyptology and archaeology in Strasbourg and Berlin, obtaining his doctorate from the University of Strasbourg in 1891. As a student his influences included Johannes Dümichen, Adolf Michaelis and Adolf Erman. After graduation, he continued his education in Paris as a student of Gaston Maspero. In 1899 he became an associate professor at Strasbourg, where in 1907 he obtained a full professorship. In 1919 he relocated to the University of Heidelberg, and four years later succeeded Friedrich Wilhelm von Bissing as chair of Egyptology at the University of Munich.

Starting in 1894, he took part in excavatory work in Egypt, most notably at the Necropolis of Thebes. Around 1900 he began work at the Egyptian Museum in Cairo, serving as a cataloger and editor of Demotic material. Spiegelberg made important contributions towards the deciphering of Demotic script and in the field of Demotic lexicography.

During his tenure at Munich, he accompanied novelist Thomas Mann to Egypt, where he provided assistance towards the drafting of Mann's "Joseph" tetralogy. In 1919 he became a member of the Heidelberg Academy of Sciences (a non-resident member since 1923), and from 1924, was a full member of the Bavarian Academy of Sciences.

Selected works 
 Studien und Materialien zum Rechtswesen des Pharaonenreiches der Dynastien XVIII–XXI, Hannover 1892 (dissertation) – Studies on the law of the Pharaohs of the dynasties XVIII–XXI.
 Geschichte der ägyptische Kunst bis zum Hellenismus, 1903 – History of Egyptian art up until the Hellenistic period.
 Der Aufenthalt Israels in Aegypten im Lichte der aegyptischen Monumente, 1904.
 Elephantine-Papyri, 1907 (with Otto Rubensohn; Wilhelm Schubart) – Elephantine papyri.
 Die Schrift und Sprache der alten Ägypter, 1907 – The script and language of the ancient Egyptians.
 Koptisches Handwörterbuch, 1921 – Coptic pocket dictionary. 
 Demotische Papyri, Heidelberg 1923 – Demotic papyri.
 Demotische grammatik, 1925 – Demotic grammatics.

References

External links
 

1870 births
1930 deaths
Writers from Hanover
Academic staff of the University of Strasbourg
Academic staff of Heidelberg University
Academic staff of the Ludwig Maximilian University of Munich
Archaeologists from Lower Saxony
German Egyptologists
German male non-fiction writers